The Seue Peaks are peaks located on the Antarctic Peninsula, standing between Bentley Crag and Mount Rendu on Arrowsmith Peninsula in Graham Land.

Mountains of Graham Land
Loubet Coast